Scott, Ontario is a geographic township and former municipality located in what was Ontario County (now Durham Region), Ontario, Canada. It is now part of the Township of Uxbridge.

The Township was surveyed in 1807 as part of what was then York County.  It was named for Thomas Scott (1746–1824), an Attorney-General and Chief Justice for Upper Canada.  Scott Township was incorporated in 1850 and became part of the newly formed Ontario County in 1852.  A Township hall was built in 1860.

Scott Township was amalgamated with the Town and Township of Uxbridge to form an expanded Township of Uxbridge upon the creation of the Regional Municipality of Durham in 1974.

Communities in the former territory of Scott include Leaskdale, Sandford, Udora and Zephyr.

Leaskdale Manse, the former home of L. M. Montgomery, the author of Anne of Green Gables is located in the Township at Leaskdale.  Montgomery lived in the area from 1911 to 1926, and wrote several books during that time.  The Manse was designated a National Historic Site of Canada in 1996.

See also
List of townships in Ontario

References

Former municipalities in Ontario
Geographic townships in Ontario
Communities in the Regional Municipality of Durham
Former townships in Ontario
Populated places disestablished in 1974